Rodney Leon is an American architect. He is the founder of Rodney Leon Architect. He is the designer of the monument "The Ark of Return", and the memorial for the New York City African Burial Ground National Monument. He specializes in urban planning projects in the United States of America, and abroad, projects with cultural, residential, and religious. He is a member of The Haitian Roundtable (HRT). It is an organization of the Haitian-American professionals committed to civic engagement as well as philanthropic endeavors to benefit Haiti. It was started in 2008.

Early life 
Leon was born and raised in Brooklyn, New York. His parents were immigrants from Haiti.

Career
In 1992, Leon received a Bachelor of Architecture degree from Pratt Institute School of Architecture in New York City. In 1995, he received a Masters of Architecture from Yale University. From 1998 to 2003,  he was visiting Design Professor at Pratt Institute School of Architecture in New York City. In 2003 he was 2nd Year Design Coordinator for Pratt in 2003. He is as an Adjunct Professor of Advanced Design since 2009. Since 2014 Leon is a Capital and Planning Grants Reviewer for the New York State Council of the Arts.

In 1998, Leon submitted a proposal to design the African Burial Ground National Monument in New York City.  He was one of the five designers selected from 61 applicants. In 2005, he was designated the official designer for the monument. Rodney Leon was designer, and co-founder along with Nicole Hollant-Denis of the AARRIS Architects were chosen to build the $3 million permanent memorial. The memorial was built on the colonial-era burial ground of enslaved Africans in lower Manhattan, in New York City. The grave site was found in 1991.

Leon was the designer of 'The Art of Return' it was the United Nations Educational, Scientific and Cultural Organization (UNESCO)'s winning design. It was an international competition. Leon's design entitled the 'Art of Return' was chosen from 310 design proposals from 83 countries that entered the competition. It is installed at the United Nations Plaza in New York City. The Ark is a Permanent Memorial that honors the African victims of enslavement during the Transatlantic Slave Trade. It was unveiled on March 25, 2015. The unveiling of the Ark of Return marked the United Nations' International Decade for People of African Descent. March 25, 2015 was the starting of the International Day of Remembrance of the Victims of Slavery and the Transatlantic Slave Trade. In 2015 Secretary-General of the United Nations Ban Ki-moon, Sam Kutesa the President of the United Nations General Assembly, and Prime Minister Portia Simpson Miller of Jamaica were the ribbon cutters during unveiling ceremony of “The Ark of Return”.

2008 was the beginning of the United Nations' International Day of Remembrance of the Victims of Slavery and the Transatlantic Slave Trade. The beginning theme was "Breaking the Silence, Lest We Forget".

Leon is a member of American Institute of Architects (AIA), and National Organization of Minority Architects (NOMA). Leon and Nicole Hollant-Denis are the principal architects for Belle Rive Residential Resort in Jacmel, Haiti. It is a private resort style residential development with 94 townhouses, tower apartments, and a 120-room four start hotel and private club.

Ark of Return Elements
The design concept of the Ark of Return has three primary elements. The first element is to acknowledge the tragedy. It is a three-dimensional map. The map depicts the global scale of the slave trade.
 The second element is to, consider the legacy. It has a full scale human figure lying down. This element is in front of a wall with images of the interior of a slave ship. This element is designed to illustrates the conditions that millions of African people were subjected to during the Middle Passage.
 The third element, lest we forget is a triangular pool where visitors can reflect and honor the millions of people that lost their lives during the Transatlantic slave trade.

Architectural projects

Cultural designs
 The Ark of Return
 African Burial Ground Memorial
 Museum of Contemporary African Diaspora Arts
 National Hip Hop Museum Master Plan
 Salvation Army Community Center in the Bushwick neighborhood of Brooklyn

Residential
 Belle Rive Residential Resort Master Plan
 River Front View
 Le Coeur Vert
 Haiti Softhouse
 Cycle of Life Housing

Religious
 Islamic Cultural Center
 French Evangelical Church
 Convent Avenue Baptist Church

Leon is a member of American Institute of Architects (AIA), and National Organization of Minority Architects (NOMA). Leon and Nicole Hollant-Denis are the principal architects for Belle Rive Residential Resort in Jacmel, Haiti. It is a private resort style residential development with 94 townhouses, tower apartments, and a 120-room four start hotel and private club.

Quotes
“The African Burial Ground National Monument serves to educate current and future generations about the extreme sacrifices and profound contributions made by enslaved African-descendant communities to the building of our great city and country.  The memorial is meant to provide our ancestors with the acknowledgement, dignity and respect in death that they were not afforded in life". Rodney Leon

References

External links
 African Burial Ground Exterior Monument
Ark of Return Brochure 
United Nations Art of Return
Architect Rodney Leon visits United Nations Headquarters
Rodney's Journey: Making the ark of return
The Ark of Return

Year of birth missing (living people)
Living people
20th-century American architects
21st-century American architects
American people of Haitian descent
Architects from New York City
Haitian architects
Haitian designers
Pratt Institute alumni
Pratt Institute faculty